is a Japanese talent agency representing a fair number of voice actors and other Japanese entertainers.

Voice actors currently affiliated with Aoni
All names are in Western order (given name followed by family/last name).

Mai Aizawa
Kenji Akabane
Shin Aomori
Ryōhei Arai
Daiki Arioka
Yōhei Azakami
Nobutoshi Canna
Hisao Egawa
Masashi Ebara
Hiroko Emori
Miyako Endō
Yukiyo Fujii
Toshio Furukawa
Tōru Furuya
Banjō Ginga
Aya Hara
Lenne Hardt
Junko Hagimori
Fumi Hirano
Masato Hirano
Ryo Hirohashi
Aya Hisakawa
Katsuhisa Hōki
Hideyuki Hori
Yukitoshi Hori
Mitsuko Horie
Mami Horikoshi
Chigusa Ikeda
Michihiro Ikemizu
Kazue Ikura
Naoki Imamura
Tetsu Inada
Marina Inoue
Hideo Ishikawa
Kanae Itō
Mitsuo Iwata
Yumi Kakazu
Hirohiko Kakegawa
Shino Kakinuma
Hiroshi Kamiya
Ryōsuke Kanemoto
Yui Kano
Rumi Kasahara
Machiko Kawana
Yasuhiko Kawazu
Mami Kingetsu
Takuya Kirimoto
Atsushi Kisa'ichi
Yukimasa Kishino
Yonehiko Kitagawa
Michitaka Kobayashi
Rika Komatsu
Yuka Komatsu
Hiromi Konno
Mariko Kouda
Takayuki Kondou
Marika Kouno
Yoshiyuki Kono
Mami Koyama
Takeshi Kusao
Houko Kuwashima
Yuji Machi
Ai Maeda
Ai Nagano
Tomoko Maruo
Mami Matsui
Masaya Matsukaze
Taiki Matsuno
Takashi Matsuyama
Yasunori Masutani
Eiko Masuyama
Hikaru Midorikawa
Shiori Mikami
Yūko Minaguchi
Yūko Mita
Hiroaki Miura
Katsue Miwa
Wasabi Mizuta
Fumie Mizusawa
Yuki Nagaku
Yuko Nagashima
Kazuya Nakai
Chisato Nakajima
Tōru Nakane
Taeko Nakanishi
Sara Nakayama
Keiichi Nanba
Kumiko Nishihara
Hiromi Nishikawa
Keiichi Noda
Yuri Noguchi
Kenji Nojima
Kenji Nomura
Ai Nonaka
Masako Nozawa
Yūsuke Numata
Mahito Ōba
Fukushi Ochiai
Yūsei Oda
Shin'ichirō Ōta
Ryōtarō Okiayu
Masaya Onosaka
Ryūzaburō Ōtomo
Hitomi Ōwada
Naomi Ōzora
Romi Park
Kimiko Saitō
Yuka Saitō
Osamu Saka
Daisuke Sakaguchi
Ayane Sakura
Akemi Satō
Ayaka Saitō
Chie Satō
Masaharu Satō
Satomi Satō
Yūki Satō
Shinobu Satōchi
Miyuki Sawashiro
Hidekatsu Shibata
Shino Shimoji
Bin Shimada
Junko Shimakata
Nobunaga Shimazaki
Naomi Shindō
Kōzō Shioya
Ryōko Shiraishi
Umeka Shōji
Hisayoshi Suganuma
Kazuko Sugiyama
Mariko Suzuki
Masami Suzuki
Sanae Takagi
Yasuhiro Takato
Karin Takahashi
Yugo Takahashi
Gara Takashima
Masaya Takatsuka
Eiji Takemoto
Ryōta Takeuchi
Mayumi Tanaka
Hideyuki Tanaka
Ryōichi Tanaka
Atsuki Tani
Kanako Tateno
Naoki Tatsuta
Yōko Teppōzuka
Kyōko Terase
Michie Tomizawa
Kyōko Tongū
Kimito Totani
Machiko Toyoshima
Minami Tsuda
Makoto Tsumura
Noriko Uemura
Megumi Urawa
Emi Uwagawa
Misa Watanabe
Naoko Watanabe
Nana Yamaguchi
Taro Yamaguchi
Yuriko Yamaguchi
Keiko Yamamoto
Yuriko Yamamoto
Wakana Yamazaki
Michiyo Yanagisawa
Miwa Yasuda
Yusaku Yara
Takahiro Yoshimizu
Aoi Yūki

Voice actors formerly affiliated with Aoni

Masashi Amenomori (deceased)
Takeshi Aono (deceased)
Yoshiko Asai
Masumi Asano
Kinpei Azusa (deceased)
Sachiko Chijimatsu
Toshiko Fujita (deceased)
Jun Fukuyama (co-founded and now at BLACKSHIP)
Daisuke Gōri (deceased)
Keiko Han (moved to NEVERLAND Arts)
Eriko Hara
Show Hayami
Eiko Hisamura
Chieko Honda (deceased)
Ryo Horikawa (now the director of Aslead Company)
Kazuhiko Inoue (now the director of B-Box)
Makio Inoue (deceased)
Unshō Ishizuka (deceased)
Akira Kamiya
Akemi Kanda
Tomoko Kaneda (now at Across Entertainment)
Eiji Kanie (deceased)
Chiyoko Kawashima (retired)
Iemasa Kayumi (deceased) 
Takaya Kuroda
Kaneta Kimotsuki (deceased)
Konomi Maeda
Ginzo Matsuo (deceased)
Minori Matsushima (deceased)
Yūji Mitsuya
Kōhei Miyauchi (deceased)
Yūko Mizutani (deceased)
Katsuji Mori
Masakazu Morita
Mugihito
Ichirō Nagai (deceased)
Nao Nagasawa (formerly Naomi Nagasawa - now affiliated with Ken Production)
Shiho Niiyama (deceased)
Junko Noda (moved to Kaleidoscope, now freelance)
Michiko Nomura
Megumi Ogata
Kenichi Ogata (now at Production Baobab)
Shinji Ogawa (moved to Office Osawa, now deceased)
Noriko Ohara
Makiko Ōmoto
Marina Ōno
Daisuke Ōno - now freelance.
Hiroshi Ōtake (deceased)
Chikao Ōtsuka (deceased)
Yumiko Shibata
Shunsuke Shima (deceased)
Yoku Shioya
Kaneto Shiozawa (deceased)
Fuyumi Shiraishi (deceased)
Mayumi Shō (moved to Kekke Corporation)
Kazuyuki Sogabe (retired/deceased)
Tomiko Suzuki (deceased)
Chiaki Takahashi (moved to Arts Vision, now freelance)
Kazunari Tanaka (deceased)
Sakura Tange
Isamu Tanonaka (deceased)
Keiko Toda
Yumi Tōma (now at her own agency ALLURE&Y)
Akane Tomonaga
Kōsei Tomita (moved to Production Baobab, now deceased)
Kei Tomiyama (deceased)
Kouji Totani (deceased)
Noriko Tsukase (deceased)
Hiromi Tsuru (deceased)
Kōji Yada (deceased)
Fushigi Yamada (formerly Kyoko Yamada)
Keaton Yamada
Jōji Yanami (deceased)
Natsumi Yanase
Rihoko Yoshida
Haruka Nakanishi

References

External links
  
 

Talent agencies based in Tokyo
Japanese voice actor management companies
Mass media in Tokyo
Mass media companies established in 1969